The Maronites in Cyprus, Maronite Cypriots, are an ethnoreligious group and/or members of the Maronite Catholic Archeparchy of Cyprus whose ancestors migrated from present-day Lebanon during the Middle Ages. A percentage of them traditionally speak a dialect which is a combination of Arabic, Turkish and Greek, recently recognized as a variety of Arabic known as Cypriot Arabic, in addition to Greek. People speaking this Arabic dialect originate from one village, specifically Kormakitis. As Eastern Catholics of the West Syriac Rite, they are in full communion with the Catholic Church of Rome.

 the Archbishop of Cyprus was Youssef Soueif, born in Chekka, Lebanon on 14 July 1962.  He was ordained Archbishop on 6 December 2008 at the Basilica of Our Lady of Lebanon-Harissa by the Patriarch Cardinal Nasrallah Boutros Sfeir.  The Mass of Enthronement was held at the Maronite Cathedral of Our Lady of Graces in Nicosia, Cyprus on 21 December 2008.  He succeeded the Emeritus Archbishop of Cyprus Boutros Gemayel, who lives in Lebanon.

Legal status
Legally defined in the Constitution of Cyprus as a religious group within the Greek Cypriot community, which they chose to join by vote just before independence alongside their fellow Roman Catholics of the Latin Rite and the Armenians. While Maronites are part of the Greek Cypriot electoral register when voting for president and members of the house of representatives, they also vote for a special representative that is not an MP but corresponds to the now non functioning communal chambers of the Greek and Turkish communities.

Demographics
In the 13th century there were about 50,000 Maronites in Cyprus, living in 60 villages, a number that dropped down to 33 before the Ottoman conquest in 1571. The number of Maronites kept declining through the Ottoman rule; 19 Maronite villages were recorded in 1599 by Girolamo Dardini, in 1629, Pietro Vespa records that the community of 1500 Maronites is served by 11 priests, in 8 churches; Giovanni Battista da Todi records 800 Maronites, distributed across 10 villages, and served by 12 priests, in 1647, but fourteen years later, in 1661, he counts only eight villages with Maronite populations 125. In 1669, we find 1,000 souls distributed in 10 villages. Dominique Jauna records a total of 1,000 Maronites and Armenians, around 1747. In 1776, the patriarchate of Lebanon lists 500 Maronites. The 1841 Ottoman census  of Talaat Effendi gave a figure of 1,400 Maronites, including 100 in the kaza of Morfou, 1,000 in that of Lapithos-Cérines, 300 in that of Nicosia. In the 1891 census, out of 209,286 Cypriots 1,131 were Maronites, the figure rose to 1,350 in 1921 and 1,704 in 1931.

Until the Turkish invasion of 1974, the town of Kormakitis was known as a centre of Maronite culture.

According to the 1960 census, there were 2,752 Maronites, mainly in the four northern villages of Kormakitis, Karpaseia, Asomatos, and Agia Marina. Following the hostilities between the Greek and Turkish communities that led to the de facto division of Cyprus, most Maronites dispersed to the south. Only about 150 mostly elderly people remained within Northern Cyprus. , the total estimated population is about 5,000–6,000, primarily in the southern area of Nicosia.

75% of Maronites live in Nicosia, 15% in Limassol, and 5% in Larnaca.

See also
Cypriot Maronite Arabic
Lebanese Arabic
Lebanese people in Cyprus
Greek Cypriots
Maronite Church
Roman Catholicism in Cyprus
Human rights in Northern Cyprus

References

External links
A Reading in the History of the Maronites of Cyprus From the Eighth Century to the Beginning of British Rule

Maronite Church in Cyprus
Lebanese diaspora in Cyprus
Ethnic groups in Cyprus
Medieval Cyprus